Jalan Tanjung Selangor (Pahang state route C101) is a major road in Pahang, Malaysia.

List of junctions

Roads in Pahang